Wang Gui (1019–1085), courtesy name Yuyu, was a high-ranking Song dynasty minister, serving as the chancellor for 16 years during Emperor Shenzong's and Emperor Zhezong's reigns. A timid opportunist without views, Wang accomplished virtually nothing in office.

References

1019 births
1085 deaths
Song dynasty chancellors